"Fooled Again" may refer to:

 "Fooled Again", a 1988 single by Pseudo Echo.
 "Fooled Again (I Don't Like It)", a 1976 song by Tom Petty and the Heartbreakers from their debut album.
Fooled Again, How the Right Stole the 2004 Elections, a book on election fraud in the United States by Mark Crispin Miller
"Won't Get Fooled Again",  a rock anthem by the rock band The Who